The Chronique de la Pucelle or Chronique de Cousinot was composed by Guillaume Cousinot (1400-1484), seigneur de Montreuil, the son of Guillaume Cousinot (d. circa 1442) who was chancellor to Louis I, Duke of Orléans. The younger Cousinot is a major contemporary source for descriptions of the episode of the Hundred Years' War that featured the career of Joan of Arc. 

The Chronique de la Pucelle was first published in 1661, as an anonymous work, by the historian and archivist Denis Godefroy (1615-1681). Its 19th century editor, Vallet de Viriville, kept the original title.

References

External links
"La chronique de la Pucelle" 
Medieval Sourcebook: Joan of Arc: Letter to the King of England, 1429 Translated by Belle Tuten from Auguste Vallet de Viriville, ed. Chronique de la Pucelle, ou Chronique de Cousinot... (Paris: Adolphe Delahaye) 1859:281-283.

Hundred Years' War literature
French chronicles
15th-century history books
Joan of Arc